Xiong Dan (reigned c. 941 BC) was the third viscount of the state of Chu during the early Zhou Dynasty of ancient China. His grandfather Xiong Yi was enfeoffed by King Cheng of Zhou and granted the hereditary noble rank of viscount. Xiong Dan succeeded his father Xiong Ai.

According to the Bamboo Annals, after the death of King Zhao of Zhou during his expedition against Chu, his son King Mu of Zhou again attacked Chu in the 37th year of his reign (941 BC) and was again defeated. It is generally believed that this happened during Xiong Dan's reign.

Xiong Dan was succeeded by his son, Xiong Sheng. His younger son Xiong Yang also ascended the throne after Xiong Sheng's death.

References

Monarchs of Chu (state)
10th-century BC Chinese monarchs
Year of birth unknown
Year of death unknown